The Glâmboca (also: Glimboca) is a right tributary of the river Bistra in Romania. It flows into the Bistra in the village Glimboca.

References

Rivers of Romania
Rivers of Caraș-Severin County